The Cincinnati-class cruisers were two small protected cruisers built for the United States Navy in the early 1890s. They were smaller and more lightly armed and protected than most previous US cruisers, and were intended for commerce raiding. They may also be referred to as Raleigh-class cruisers, as Raleigh was launched and commissioned prior to Cincinnati.

Design and construction

As the U.S. Navy began to rebuild its fleet with steel-hulled vessels to keep pace with the advance of naval technology in the 1880s, it explored a wide range of design concepts. Among the approaches to the protected cruiser design was that of a small and fast commerce raider. Thus, in the 1888 naval appropriations bill, Congress set aside money to build five such vessels, two Cincinnati class of 3,000 tons and three Montgomery class of 2,000 tons.

In May 1889, the Department of the Navy invited proposals for the construction of two cruisers of about 3,000 tons displacement each, at a cost of not more than $1,100,000 each. William Cramp & Sons was the only shipbuilder to respond, but with a bid in excess of the limit; the Department of the Navy exercised an option in the appropriation bill to construct the cruisers in its own yards; Cincinnati was built at the Brooklyn Navy Yard, while Raleigh was built at the Norfolk Navy Yard.

Armament

The as-built main armament of the ships was one /40 caliber gun on the forward deck and ten /40 caliber guns (two side-by-side on the aft deck, the remainder in sponsons along the sides). Secondary armament was eight 6-pounder rapid fire guns, two 1-pounder rapid fire guns, along with one Gatling gun and four 18 inch (450 mm) torpedo tubes. Along with Olympia and the Montgomery class, these were among the first US Navy ships to carry 5-inch guns.

Armor

Engineering

Some references state the class carried fore-and-aft sails as built, other references state they were never carried. The as-built propulsion plant proved to have a high coal consumption and could not maintain  for long; the boilers and engines were replaced in refits circa 1901.

Refits

Cincinnati was refitted in 1899-1901; Raleigh followed in 1899-1903. The lone 6-inch gun was replaced by an additional 5-inch/40 caliber gun and the torpedo tubes were removed. Two 5-inch guns, for a total of nine remaining, were removed by 1918.

Service
Both ships were engaged in the Spanish–American War, Cincinnati off Cuba and Raleigh in the Philippines. Raleigh is credited with firing the first shot of the Battle of Manila Bay from a 5-inch/40 caliber gun in 1898. Raleigh also engaged in the early part of the Philippine–American War, while Cincinnati protected American citizens and interests during political unrest in the Caribbean. Both served in East Asia 1903–1907, after which both were decommissioned until 1911. Cincinnati then spent six years in East Asia, followed by patrol duty in the Gulf of Mexico during World War I. Raleigh operated in Mexico and Central America 1913–1916, followed by a yard period. After the US entered World War I in 1917, Raleigh operated from Brazil, and in mid-1918 joined Cincinnati in the Gulf of Mexico. In mid-1919 both ships were decommissioned, and both were scrapped in 1921.

Ships in class

The two ships of the Cincinnati class were:

Note: It appears that the hull numbers PG-25 and PG-26 (patrol gunboat) were reserved for these ships as part of a fleet-wide redesignation in 1920, but the ships were ordered sold before the redesignation took effect on 17 July 1920.

See also
 List of cruisers of the United States Navy

References

Bibliography

External links

Cruiser Photo Gallery Index at NavSource Naval History

 
Cruiser classes